Aprotheca is a genus of bristle flies in the family Tachinidae.

Species
Aprotheca basalis Macquart, 1851
Aprotheca tenuisetosa (Macquart, 1847)

References

Diptera of Australasia
Exoristinae
Tachinidae genera
Taxa named by Pierre-Justin-Marie Macquart